Yui Yatyer, real name Jariya Preedakul, is a Luk thung singer.

Biography
Yui Yatyer was born on 19 February 1978 and is the daughter of Chana-Saiyud Preedakul. Her stage career began when she won the TV variety series Concert Contest in 1987, and she has been a prominent figure in Thai entertainment ever since.

In 1995, she signed onto Four-S label. Her most popular songs include "Phok Miea Ma Dua Ruea", "Noo Chop Chop", "Lueak Miea Bok Maa", "Hoa Hai Duea",  "Khun Nai Khaa Ma Laeng Saab".

She is married to Choo-Chat Phongtrakool and they have one son.

Discography

Albums
Wan Raek Juea Luey ยุ้ยเป็นสาวแล้ว ชุด 1 วันแรกเจอเลย (1995)
Loea Khee Taek Khee Taen ยุ้ยเป็นสาวแล้ว ชุด 2 หล่อขี้แตกขี้แตน (1995)
Wan Raek Juea Luey ยุ้ยเป็นสาวแล้ว ชุด 3 ขึ้นเอ๊า ขึ้นเอา (1995)
Lueak Miea Bok Maa ยุ้ยเป็นสาวแล้ว ชุด 4 เลิกเมียบอกมา (1996)
Tieam Niew ยุ้ยเป็นสาวแล้ว ชุด 5 เต็มเหนี่ยว (1996)
Rak Khon Loea Ngoa Khon Ruey ยุ้ยเป็นสาวแล้ว ชุด 6 รักคนหล่อง้อคนรวย (1997)
Yoea Aa Rome ยุ้ยเป็นสาวแล้ว ชุด 7 เหยื่ออารมณ์ (1997)
Phok Miea Ma Duea Ruea ยุ้ยเป็นสาวแล้ว ชุด 8 พกเมียมาด้วยเหรอ (1997)
Hoa Hai Duea ยุ้ยเป็นสาวแล้ว ชุด 9  ห่อให้ด้วย (1998)
Noo Chop Chop ยุ้ยเป็นสาวแล้ว ชุด 10 หนูช๊อบชอบ (1998)
Mee Nee Mai Nia ยุ้ยเป็นสาวแล้ว ชุด 11 มีหนี้ไหมเนี่ย (1999)
Khoe Noo Naa ยุ้ยเป็นสาวแล้ว ชุด 12 ขอหนูนะ (2000)
Tam Ha Khoo Man ชุด 13 ตามหาคู่หมั้น (2001)
Joe Hua Jai ชุด 14 จอหัวใจ (2001)
Phuea Khao Thang Nan ชุด 15 ผัวเขาทั้งนั้น (2002)
Ja Road Mai Niea ชุด 16 จะรอดไหมเนี่ย (2002)
Rak Oaa Hai Roae Bap ชุด 17 รักอ้อให้รอแป๊บ (2003)
Khad Khon Ru Jai ชุด 18 ขาดคนรู้ใจ (2003)
Khon Thai Kluea Miea ชุด 19 คนไทยกลัวเมีย (2003)
Sud Yod ชุด 20 สุดยอด (2004)
Rak Kao Thee Khao Lueam ชุด 21 รักเก่าที่เขาลืม (2005)
Man Tong Yang Nan See ชุด 22 มันต้องยังงั้นซิ (2005)
Khon Thai Dueam ชุด 23 คนไทยเดิม (2006)
Naa Taa Khun Khun ชุด 24 หน้าตาคุ้นคุ้น (2007)
Phood Mai Kid ชุด 25 พูดไม่คิด (2008)
Yuei Maa Laew Jaa ชุด 26 ยุ้ยมาแล้วจ้า (2010)
Phee Klam Hua ชุด 27 ผีคลำหัว (2018)

References

1978 births
Living people
Yui Yatyer
Yui Yatyer
Yui Yatyer